The Middle Kingdom is the second studio album by the Irish Celtic metal band Cruachan released in 2000 on Hammerheart Records.

Track listing

Personnel
Keith Fay – vocals, guitars, mandolin, bodhrán, bones
Karen Gilligan – vocals, percussion
Joe Farrell – drums, percussion
John O'Fathaigh – Irish flute, tin whistle, low whistle, recorder, uilleann pipes, artwork
John Clohessy – bass, vocals (backing)

Additional personnel
Andy Kelligan – Great Highland bagpipe
John Munnelly – vocals on "Is Fuair an Chroí" and "To Hell or to Connaught"
Marco Jeurissen – layout
Dennis Buckley – engineering, producer

Cruachan (band) albums
2000 albums
Hammerheart Records albums